Walter Scott Driskill (September 20, 1913 – July 25, 1998) was a professional football coach for the Baltimore Colts of the All-America Football Conference in 1949. He was also the creator and owner of Dribeck Importers Inc., the North American importer of Beck's beer.

Driskill earned his bachelor's in history from the University of Colorado in 1936 and his master's in history in 1940. He also played football for the school from 1931 until 1935, where he lettered three times as a tackle and was a teammate of Byron "Whizzer" White.

In 2009, Driskill's estate donated $750,000 to the University of Colorado's history department.

References

1913 births
1998 deaths
American football tackles
Baltimore Colts (1947–1950) coaches
Colorado Buffaloes football coaches
Colorado Buffaloes football players
Maryland Terrapins athletic directors
Maryland Terrapins football coaches
Oklahoma Sooners football coaches
Wyoming Cowboys football coaches